Noeetini is a tribe of tephritid  or fruit flies in the family Tephritidae.

Genera
Acidogona Loew, 1873
Ensina Robineau-Desvoidy, 1830
Hypenidium Loew, 1862
Jamesomyia Quisenberry, 1949
Noeeta Robineau-Desvoidy, 1830
Paracanthella Portschinsky, 1875
Trigonochorium Becker, 1913

References

Tephritinae
Diptera of Europe
Diptera of Asia
Diptera tribes